Dutch Windmills was a professional basketball club based in Dordrecht, Netherlands. The club was founded in 2017 and entered the Dutch Basketball League for the 2018–19 season. In April of the same season, the club withdrew from the league due to financial problems. Home games of the club were played at the Sportboulevard Dordrecht, which has a capacity for 1,100 people.

History 
On 14 September 2017, the establishment of the club Dutch Windmills was announced along with the intention to enter the Dutch Basketball League for the 2017–18 season. On 3 May 2018, the DBL officially announced the team's participation in the upcoming season. On 6 July, Geert Hammink was appointed as head coach. Windmills played its debut game in the DBL on 7 October 2018, and lost 64–78 to Landstede Zwolle.

Despite reaching the semi-finals of the NBB Cup and being in the fifth place in the DBL, Windmills struggled with financial problems throughout the season. In December 2018, Windmills was refused entrance to its home arena due to its payment arrears. On 10 April 2019, it was announced that Windmills would withdraw from the DBL. Its results in the second half of the competition were scrapped by the DBL.

Season by season 

 The club was disqualified from the league.

Players

2018–19 roster

Individual awards 
DBL All-Rookie Team
Jito Kok – 2019
Nick Hammink – 2019

Head coaches

References

External links 
Official website
Official Twitter

Basketball teams established in 2017
Basketball teams disestablished in 2019
Former Dutch Basketball League teams
Defunct basketball teams in the Netherlands
Sports clubs in Dordrecht